Anopina dentata is a species of moth from the family Tortricidae. It is found in Veracruz, Mexico.

References

Moths described in 2000
dentata
Moths of Central America